Sphaerospira rockhamptonensis, common name the Rockhampton banded snail,  is a species of air-breathing land snails, terrestrial pulmonate gastropod mollusks in the family Camaenidae. 

This species is endemic to Australia.

References

 Cox, J.C. 1873, "Descriptions of new land-shells from Australia and the Solomon Islands", Proceedings of the Zoological Society of London, vol. 1873, pp. 146-152
 Angas, G.F. 1876, "Descriptions of four new species of Helix, with some notes on Helix angasiana of Pfeiffer", Proceedings of the Zoological Society of London, vol. 1876, pp. 265-268
 Brazier, J. 1881, "Notes on shells from the Solomon Islands and Australia", Proceedings of the Linnean Society of New South Wales, vol. 5, pp. 444-447
 Iredale, T. 1937, "A basic list of the land Mollusca of Australia. Pt II", The Australian Zoologist, vol. 9, pp. 1-39
 Smith, B.J. 1992, "Non-Marine Mollusca", Ed. Houston, W.W.K. (ed.), Zoological Catalogue of Australia. Non-marine Mollusca, vol. 8, Australian Government Publishing Service, Canberra

External links
 2006 IUCN Red List of Threatened Species.   Downloaded on 7 August 2007.

Gastropods of Australia
rockhamptonensis
Gastropods described in 1873
Taxonomy articles created by Polbot